is a former Japanese football player.

Club statistics

References

External links

j-league

1974 births
Living people
Senshu University alumni
Association football people from Saitama Prefecture
Japanese footballers
J2 League players
Japan Football League (1992–1998) players
Japan Football League players
Omiya Ardija players
Saitama SC players
Sagawa Shiga FC players
Fagiano Okayama players
Giravanz Kitakyushu players
Association football defenders